Ravn is a surname. Notable people with the surname include:

People
Allan Ravn (born 1974), Danish former professional association football player
Anders P. Ravn (1947–2019), Danish computer scientist
Jørgen Ravn (born 1940), Danish former football (soccer) player
Mette Ravn (born 1943), Norwegian diplomat
Palle Ravn (1928–2012), Danish chess master
Per Ravn Omdal (born 1947), former president of the Norwegian Football Association
Peter Ravn (speedway rider) (born 1962), former international motorcycle speedway rider
Simon Ravn (born 1974), composer who composes orchestral music for film, television and video games

Businesses
Ravn Alaska, air marketing brand operated by Corvus Airlines based in Fairbanks, Alaska
Ravn Studio, independent game development studio based in Drammen, Norway

See also
Ravn Rock, submerged rock in the center of Neptunes Bellows, the entrance to Port Foster, Deception Island, in the South Shetland Islands
Ravn virus, a close relative of Marburg virus that causes a viral hemorrhagic fever in humans

Surnames from nicknames